Xu Lizhi may refer to:

Leetsch C. Hsu or Xu Lizhi (徐利治; 1920–2019), Chinese mathematician
Lap-Chee Tsui or Xu Lizhi (徐立之; born 1950), Chinese-Canadian geneticist
Xu Lizhi (poet) (许立志; 1990–2014), Chinese poet